Rathna Manjari is a 1962 Indian Kannada-language film, directed by Hunsur Krishnamurthy and produced by Hunsur Krishnamurthy and D. Puttaswamy. The film stars Udaykumar, Narasimharaju, K. S. Ashwath and C. V. Shivashankar. The film has musical score by Rajan–Nagendra. H.R. Bhargava was the assistant director of this movie. The movie was dubbed in Telugu as Maya Mohini.It was dubbed in Tamil with the same title and released in 1962.

Cast

Udaykumar
Narasimharaju
K. S. Ashwath
C. V. Shivashankar
M. P. Shankar
Subbanna
Sriranga
Hanumanthachar
Ramachandra Shastry
Krishna Shastry
Hanumantha Rao
Sarot Ashwath
Girimaji
M. Leelavathi
Harini
Rajasree
M. N. Lakshmidevi
B. Jayashree
Shanthamma
Master Hunasur Siriprasad

Soundtrack
The music was composed by T. G. Lingappa.

References

External links
 
 

1962 films
1960s Kannada-language films
Films scored by Rajan–Nagendra
Films directed by Hunsur Krishnamurthy

kn:ರತ್ನಮಂಜರಿ